Carmen Aída Lazo (San Salvador, January 3, 1976) is a Salvadoran economist and dean of the School of Economics and Business at Escuela Superior de Economía y Negocios. She was a candidate for Vice President of El Salvador for the National Coalition Party (El Salvador) (PCN) for the 2019 Presidential Election.

Early life and education
In 1994, Lazo began studying economics at Escuela Superior de Economía y Negocios. She graduated with honors 1999, and subsequently earned a master's degree in applied macroeconomics from the Catholic University of Chile and a master's degree in public administration from Harvard University. While attending Harvard, she received scholarships from the governments of Japan, the United States and from the World Bank.

Career 
She worked as Program Officer and as Deputy Coordinator of the Human Development Report in the United Nations Development Program (UNDP). She also worked in the Ministry of Economy as an Advisor on issues such as energy, international trade, free zones, statistics and negotiations with different sectors. At the same time, she was part of the first Board of Directors of the Superintendence of Competition and assumed the role of President of the Board of Directors of the organization Un Techo para mi País. She was part of the team of the Partnership for Growth, as well as in the formulation and negotiation of Fomilenio II.

Politics 
In 2018, she was elected as the representative of the National Concertation Party (PCN) to be registered in the presidential election of El Salvador in 2019. She is currently a candidate for the Vice Presidency of El Salvador for the PCN together with Carlos Calleja from ARENA.

Personal life
She is married to Ivan Sanjines and mother of 2 children, Pandy and Camila.

References

External links
Carmen Aída Lazo, Escuela Superior de Economía y Negocios 

1976 births
Living people
Salvadoran economists
Pontifical Catholic University of Chile alumni
Harvard Kennedy School alumni
21st-century Salvadoran women politicians
21st-century Salvadoran politicians
National Coalition Party (El Salvador) politicians
United Nations Development Programme officials